Lindsey S. Holmes (born 1973) is a Republican member of the Alaska House of Representatives, representing the 26th District since 2006. She was a registered Democrat until she changed parties and joined the Alaska House Majority Coalition on January 12, 2013. Holmes declined to run for another term in 2014.

External links
 Alaska State Legislature – Representative Lindsey Holmes
 Project Vote Smart – Representative Lindsey Holmes (AK) profile
 Follow the Money – Lindsey Holmes
 2006 campaign contributions
 Alaska's House Majority – Lindsey Holmes profile
 
 Lindsey Holmes at 100 Years of Alaska's Legislature

1973 births
21st-century American politicians
21st-century American women politicians
Alaska Democrats
Alaska lawyers
Alaska Republicans
American women lawyers
Living people
Members of the Alaska House of Representatives
Politicians from Anchorage, Alaska
Women state legislators in Alaska
Lawyers from Anchorage, Alaska